This is a list of Members of Parliament (MPs) elected to the House of Commons of the United Kingdom by Northern Irish constituencies for the 58th Parliament of the United Kingdom (2019–present). There are 18 such constituencies, nine of which are represented by Nationalists and eight by Unionists. There is also one Alliance Party MP who does not identify as nationalist or unionist. It includes both MPs elected, held on 12 December 2019.

The list is sorted by the name of the MP, and MPs who did not serve throughout the Parliament are italicised. New MPs elected since the general election are noted at the bottom of the page.

Sinn Féin MPs follow an abstentionist policy of not taking their seats in the House of Commons.

2019 election results

Composition

MPs

See also
 2019 United Kingdom general election in Northern Ireland
 List of MPs elected in the 2019 United Kingdom general election
 List of MPs for constituencies in England (2019–present)
 List of MPs for constituencies in Scotland (2019–present)
 List of MPs for constituencies in Wales (2019–present)

Notes

References

2010s elections in Northern Ireland
2020s elections in Northern Ireland
Lists of MPs for constituencies in Northern Ireland